Bacchisa bicolor is a species of beetle in the family Cerambycidae. It was described by Schwartz in 1931. It is known from the Philippines.

References

Bacchisa
Beetles described in 1931
Beetles of Asia